João Henrique Pereira Villaret (born 10 May 1913 in Lisbon; died 21 January 1961) was a Portuguese actor.

Filmography
O Pai Tirano, by António Lopes Ribeiro (1941)
Inês de Castro, by Leitão de Barros (1945)
Camões, by Leitão de Barros (1946)
Três Espelhos, by Ladislao Vadja (1947)
Frei Luís de Sousa, by António Lopes Ribeiro (1950)
A Garça e a Serpente, by Arthur Duarte (1952)
O Primo Basílio, by António Lopes Ribeiro (1959).

1913 births
1961 deaths
Portuguese male film actors
People from Lisbon
20th-century Portuguese male actors
LGBT history in Portugal